The Stearman (Boeing) Model 75 is a biplane formerly used as a military trainer aircraft, of which at least 10,626 were built in the United States during the 1930s and 1940s. Stearman Aircraft became a subsidiary of Boeing in 1934. Widely known as the Stearman, Boeing Stearman,  or Kaydet, it served as a primary trainer for the United States Army Air Forces, the United States Navy (as the NS and N2S), and with the Royal Canadian Air Force as the Kaydet throughout World War II. After the conflict was over, thousands of surplus aircraft were sold on the civilian market. In the immediate postwar years, they became popular as crop dusters and sports planes, and for aerobatic and wing walking use in air shows.

Design and development

The Kaydet was a conventional biplane of rugged construction, with a large, fixed tailwheel undercarriage, and accommodation for the student and instructor in open cockpits in tandem. The radial engine was usually not cowled, although some Stearman operators choose to cowl the engine, most notably the Red Baron Stearman Squadron.

Operational history

Post-war usage
After World War II, thousands of surplus PT-17s were auctioned off to civilians and former military pilots.  Many were modified for cropdusting use, with a hopper for pesticide or fertilizer fitted in place of the front cockpit.  Additional equipment included pumps, spray bars, and nozzles mounted below the lower wings.  A popular approved modification to increase the maximum takeoff weight and climb performance involved fitting a larger Pratt & Whitney R-985 Wasp Junior engine and a constant-speed propeller.

Variants
Data from:United States Navy aircraft since 1911, Boeing aircraft since 1916 8,584 Model 70s, 75s and 76s were built, with additional "spares" bringing the number up to the sometimes quoted 10,346.

USAAC/USAAF designations
The U.S. Army Air Forces Model 75 Kaydet had three different designations, PT-13, PT-17 and PT-18, depending on which type of radial engine was installed. 
PT-13 Initial production version with Lycoming R-680-B4B engine, 26 built in 1936
PT-13A Model A75 with R-680-7 engine, 92 delivered from 1937 to 1938.
PT-13B R-680-11 engine, 255 delivered from 1939 to 1941.
PT-13C Six PT-13Bs modified for instrument flying.
PT-13D Model E75 with R-680-17 engine, 793 delivered

PT-17 Version with Continental R-670-5 engine, 2,942 delivered.
PT-17A 136 PT-17s modified with blind-flying instrumentation.
PT-17B Three PT-17s modified with agricultural spraying equipment for pest control near army bases.
PT-17C Single PT-17 conversion with standardized Army-Navy equipment.

PT-18 Version with Jacobs R-755-7 engine, 150 built. Further production was cancelled as the engines were needed for other types of trainers.
PT-18A Six PT-18s modified with blind-flying instrumentation.

PT-27
USAAF paperwork designation given to 300 D75N1/PT-17 aircraft supplied under Lend-Lease to the Royal Canadian Air Force.

US Navy designations
NS
Up to 61 Model 73B1 delivered, powered by  Wright J-5/R-790 Whirlwind radials
N2S Known colloquially as the "Yellow Peril" from its overall-yellow paint scheme.
N2S-1 Model A75N1 with Continental R-670-14 engine, 250 delivered.
N2S-2 Model B75 with Lycoming R-680-8 engine, 125 delivered in 1941.
N2S-3 Model B75N1 with Continental R-670-4 engine, 1,875 delivered.
N2S-4 Model A75N1 with Continental R-670-4 and -5 engines, 457 delivered of 579 ordered, including 99 PT-17s diverted from U.S. Army orders.
N2S-5 Model E75 with Lycoming R-680-17 engine, 1,450 delivered.

Company designations
Stearman 70
Company designation for prototype, powered by  Lycoming radial engine, designated XPT-943 for evaluation
Model 73
Initial production version, 61 built for U.S. Navy as NS plus export variants
Model 73L3
Version for the Philippines, powered by  R-680-4 or R-680C1 engines, seven built
Model A73B1
Seven aircraft for Cuban Air Force powered by  Wright R-790 Whirlwind, delivered 1939–1940
Model A73L3
Improved version for the Philippines, three built
Stearman 75
(or X75) Evaluated by the U.S. Army as a primary trainer, the X75L3 became the PT-13 prototype. Variants of the 75 formed the PT-17 family.
Stearman 76
Export trainer and armed version of the 75 with a gun ring and one or two fixed forward firing machine guns.
A76B4 5 built for Venezuela.
A76C3 15 built for Brazil.
B76C3 15 built with cameras for Brazil.
76D1 16 built for Argentina and three for Philippines as BT-1.
S76D1 seaplane version of 76D1 for Argentina
76D3 24 built for Philippine Constabulary as BT-1 armed advanced trainer, and 24 built for Cuba.

Other designations
Stearman XPT-943
Designation assigned to the X70 evaluated at Wright Field

Stearman Kaydet
Name used for aircraft in Royal Canadian Air Force service

American Airmotive NA-75
 Single-seat agricultural conversion of Model 75, fitted with new, high-lift wings

Operators

Argentine Air Force
Argentine Navy received 16 Model 76D1s 1936 to 1937 and 60 N2S Kaydet post-war; all were retired by the early 1960s

Bolivian Air Force

Brazilian Air Force Model A75L3 and 76.

Royal Canadian Air Force received 301 PT-27s under Lend Lease.

Republic of China Air Force received 150 PT-17s under Lend-Lease, and 104 refurbished aircraft post war in Taiwan. The ROCAF used them until 1958.

Colombian Air Force

Cuban Air Force

Dominican Air Force

Hellenic Air Force

Guatemalan Air Force

Honduran Air Force

Imperial Iranian Air Force

Israeli Air Force purchased 20 PT-17s.

Mexican Air Force

Nicaraguan Air Force

Paraguayan Air Force

Peruvian Air Force

Philippine Army Air Corps
Philippine Air Force

United States Army Air Corps/United States Army Air Forces
United States Marine Corps
United States Navy

Venezuelan Air Force 
 
Yugoslav Air Force

Surviving aircraft
A considerable number of Stearmans remain in flying condition throughout the world, as the type remains a popular sport plane and warbird.

Argentina
 308 – N2S-5 airworthy at the Argentine Naval Aviation Museum in Bahía Blanca, Buenos Aires.

Australia
 75-6488 – B75N1 registered as VH-EYC, airworthy, owned by Steven Bradley,   Southern Australia 5134
 75-8314 – E75 Registered as VH-USE, airworthy, owned by Raalin,  Western Australia 6208

Austria
 75-5032 – PT-17 Registered as OE-AMM, airworthy at Hangar-7, Salzburg

Brazil
 K-132 – A75L3 on display at the Museu Aeroespacial in Rio de Janeiro
 K-210 – A76C3 on display at the Museu Aeroespacial in Rio de Janeiro
 38010 – N2S-3 on display at the TAM Museum in São Carlos, São Paulo

Canada
 41-8621 – PT-17 airworthy at the Canadian Warplane Heritage Museum in Hamilton, Ontario.
 42-17456 – PT-13D owned by Daniel Jones of Lacombe, Alberta.
 5284 – N2S-3 under restoration to airworthy with Daniel Jones of Lacombe, Alberta
 5293 – N2S-3 owned by J. Kurtin of Collingwood, Ontario
 30083 – N2S-4 on display at the Reynolds-Alberta Museum in Wetaskiwin, Alberta
 61105 – N2S-5 with Bruce Bond of Sarnia, Ontario
 75-3498 – PT-17 airworthy owned by Great River Aviation Ltd. of Whitehorse, Yukon o/a Klondike Airways.

Colombia
 FAC-62 – PT-17 airworthy
 FAC-1995 – PT-17 airworthy

Iceland
 T5-1556 – PT-17 is airworthy with Erling Pétur Erlingsson in Hafnarfjörður, Capital Region. It is the oldest airplane in Iceland. It was brought to the country in 1941 by the aircraft carrier  and damaged in an accident in 1943.

Indonesia
PT-13D is on display at Dirgantara Mandala Museum in Yogyakarta. The aircraft is painted in Taloa Academy of Aeronautics livery.

Israel
 2752 – PT-17 is airworthy at the Israeli Air Force Museum in Hatzerim.

Mexico

Netherlands
 75-7027 – PT-13B is airworthy, registered as PH-TOX, owned by Joe Brewer and based at Oostwold Airport.
 75-7213 – N2S-3 is airworthy, registered as N9912H, owned by the Nordsiek family and based at Breda International Airport.

New Zealand
 75-647 – PT-17 airworthy with R. J. S. Jenkins in Ardmore, Auckland.
 75-2055 – PT-17 airworthy with R. B. Mackley in Milford.
 75-2100 – PT-17 airworthy with Classic Aircraft Sales Limited in Blenheim.
 75-2724 – PT-17 airworthy with B. L. Govenlock in Hastings.
 75-3132 – PT-17 airworthy with the Antonievich Family Trust in Pukekohe.
 75-3655 – PT-17 airworthy with M. P. Cantlon in Mount Maunganui.
 75-4245 – PT-17 airworthy with the Strome Farm Trust in Drury.
 75-5064 – PT-13D airworthy with the Stearman Syndicate in Drury.
 75-5907 – PT-13D airworthy with Stearman 03 Limited in Mount Maunganui.
 75-8025A – N2S-3 airworthy with M. J. Dean in Mount Maunganui.

Peru
 PT-17 is on display at the Instituto de Estudios Históricos Aeroespaciales del Perú, Miraflores, Lima.

Spain
 PT-17 on display at the Fundación Infante de Orleans in Cuatro Vientos, Madrid.

Switzerland
 75-5436 – PT-13D is airworthy, registered as HB-RBG, and based at the Fliegermuseum Altenrhein. Built in 1943 and restored to airworthiness in 1989 after sustaining considerable damage during an emergency landing in the grounds of the Stadler Rail factory in Altenrhein due to engine failure.

Taiwan
 PT-17 is on static display at the Aviation Education Exhibition Hall in Gangshan District, Kaohsiung City.

United States

 Model 70 is airworthy at the Western Antique Aeroplane & Automobile Museum in Hood River, Oregon. It is the original prototype of the Model 75.
 37-0099 – PT-13A is on static display at the Museum of Flight in Seattle, Washington.
 41-7960 – PT-17 is airworthy at Mississippi State University in Starkville, Mississippi. It is used as a research aircraft and glider tow-plane.
 41-8786 – PT-17 is in storage at the New England Air Museum in Windsor Locks, Connecticut.
 41-8882 – PT-17 on static display at the Pima Air and Space Museum in Tucson, Arizona.
 41-25254 – PT-17 is airworthy at the Military Aviation Museum in Pungo, Virginia.
 41-25284 – PT-17 is on static display at the Hill Aerospace Museum in Roy, Utah.
 41-25588 – PT-17 is airworthy at the Charles M. Schulz–Sonoma County Airport in Santa Rosa, California.
 41-25623 – PT-17 is on display at Patriots Point in Charleston, South Carolina.
 42-15687 – PT-27 is on display at the Vintage Flying Museum in Fort Worth, Texas.
 42-16365 – PT-17 is on static display at the Museum of Aviation in Warner Robins, Georgia.
 42-16388 – PT-17D is on static display at the March Field Air Museum near Riverside, California.
 42-16691 – PT-17 is on static display at the Castle Air Museum in Atwater, California.
 42-17591 – PT-13D is on static display at the Planes of Fame Air Museum in Chino, California.
 42-17724 – PT-13D is on static display at the National Museum of African American History and Culture in Washington, DC. It was used in 1944 to train members of the Tuskegee Airmen.
 42-17763 – PT-13D is on static display at the Planes of Fame Air Museum in Valle, Arizona.
 42-17800 – PT-13D is on static display at the National Museum of the United States Air Force in Dayton, Ohio. This aircraft is the 63rd to last aircraft built and was donated to the museum in 1959 by the Boeing Aircraft Company, which purchased the Stearman Company in 1934.
 3514 – N2S-3 is airworthy with Neil Alan Raaz in Colleyville, Texas.
 3558 – N2S-2 is under restoration to airworthy at the Planes of Fame Air Museum in Chino, California.
 5369 – N2S-3 is on static display at the National Naval Aviation Museum in Pensacola, Florida. It was flown by George H. W. Bush during his initial training as a naval pilot.
 7591 – N2S-3 is airworthy at the Valiant Air Command Warbird Museum in Titusville, Florida.
 7718 – N2S-3 is airworthy at the Lone Star Flight Museum in Houston, Texas.
 15923 – N2S is on static display at the Carolinas Aviation Museum in Charlotte, North Carolina.
 29981 – N2S-4 is on display at the Air Zoo in Kalamazoo, Michigan.
 38278 – N2S-3 is airworthy at the Tri-State Warbird Museum in Batavia, Ohio.
 38490 – N2S-5 is airworthy at the Lone Star Flight Museum in Houston, Texas.
 43197 – N2S-5 is under restoration to airworthy condition with the Commemorative Air Force Utah Wing in Heber City, Utah.
 61064 – N2S-5 on static display at the Udvar-Hazy Center of the National Air and Space Museum in Chantilly, Virginia.
 92468 – N2S-3 is on static display at the Pacific Aviation Museum Pearl Harbor in Honolulu, Hawaii. It was flown by George H. W. Bush during his initial training as a naval pilot.
75-8498 - N2S-5 is airworthy at the CAF Big Easy Wing in New Orleans, LA. 
 N2S-3 is on display at the Western Antique Aeroplane and Automobile Museum in Hood River, Oregon.

Specifications (PT-17)

In popular culture

An iconic movie image is a Stearman cropduster chasing Cary Grant across a field in North by Northwest (the airplane that chased Grant was actually a Naval Aircraft Factory N3N Canary; the plane that hits the truck is a Stearman).
A heavily modified PT-17 variant was used as the Tornado in the Sonic The Hedgehog 2 Film.

See also

References

Notes
.

Bibliography
 Andrade, John. U.S. Military Aircraft Designations and Serials since 1909, Midland Counties Publications, 1979, 
 Avis, Jim and Bowman, Martin. Stearman: A Pictorial History. Motorbooks, 1997. .
 Bowers, Peter M. Boeing Aircraft since 1916. London:Putnam, 1989. .
 Nordeen, Lon. Fighters Over Israel. London: Guild Publishing, 1991.
 Phillips, Edward H. Stearman Aircraft: A Detailed History . Specialty Press, 2006. .

 Swanborough, F.G. and Peter M. Bowers. United States Military Aircraft since 1909. London: Putnam, 1963.
 Taylor, John W. R. Jane's All The World's Aircraft 1965–66. London: Sampson Low, Marston & Company, 1965.

Videography

 Stearman, Lloyd. Stearmans, You Gotta Love Them. Lap Records, 2005. (NTSC Format)

External links

 Interview with Boeing PT-17 air show pilot John Mohr.
 Netherlander Hans Nordsiek's "The Storyteller" homepage, featuring his "Old Crow" Stearman biplane
 FAA Type Certificate

1930s United States military trainer aircraft
Stearman
Stearman aircraft
Aerobatic aircraft
Biplanes
World War II trainer aircraft of the United States
Single-engined tractor aircraft
Aircraft first flown in 1934